Jiří Helekal (born 13 February 1947, in Prague) is a multi-talented Czech singer and performer who has maintained his fame through forty years of his career in his native land. He is capable of playing many musical instruments, as well being a professional actor, appearing in many successful musicals.

Early life
Jiri Helekal grew up in the centre of Prague, near today's Praha hlavní nádraží. He has been focused on music since he was 22, when he started to play the violin. But he was soon also fascinated by playing the cello and switched over to it. He was taught by Professor Sadl and afterwards successfully graduated from Jezek's Conservatory; he became even more interested in music.

He had to postpone his artistic work due to compulsory military service. Eventually the break took longer – he worked as a furniture remover and also unloaded wood and coal.

Significance
When he achieved his first musical successes, Jiri Helekal was already able to play the guitar, violin, cello, piano, flute, banjo, contrabass, accordion and others. 
One of his first greater successes was in a band called Shut Up (beat and country). Then he defected to a band called “Comets” (rock'n'roll, twist, rhythm & blues, soul, big beat, pop), at that time composed of Hladik (guitar), Žižka (saxophone), Vladimír Mišík and Jan Hrůza (both sang with Helekal).

Later he established his own, mainly country, path. Supported by his two daughters (Katerina and Aneta) he found ‘Hele-kaly family’ and released five albums: Rambler oasis 1, Rambler oasis 2, Rambler oasis 3, Ringlet in the grass and At the time.

At the turn of the 60's and 70's his acting career took off. Between 1969 and 1973 he performed in the Semafor theatre (a very prestigious theatre in Prague) and then went on to the Broadway Theatre (also a popular Prague theatre specializing mainly in musicals), where he is still acting in musicals, for instance Cleopatra (his biggest success), Angelica and The Three Musketeers.

1947 births
Living people
21st-century Czech male singers
Musicians from Prague
20th-century Czech male singers
Czechoslovak male singers